Hellinsia costalba is a moth of the family Pterophoridae. It is found in Peru.

References

Moths described in 1996
costalba
Moths of South America